The Okanogan National Forest is a U.S. National Forest located in Okanogan County in north-central Washington, United States.

The  forest is bordered on the north by British Columbia, on the east by Colville National Forest, on the south by the divide between the Methow and the Stehekin–Lake Chelan valleys, and on the west by North Cascades National Park. The closest significant communities are Omak and Okanogan. Managed by the United States Forest Service together with Wenatchee National Forest, its headquarters are in Wenatchee. There are local ranger district offices located in Tonasket and Winthrop. It is the second-largest national forest (after the Nez Perce National Forest in Idaho) that is contained entirely within one county and largest of which in Washington.

Most of the Pasayten Wilderness (excluding its westernmost part, which lies in the Mount Baker-Snoqualmie National Forest), and the northeast portion (about 63%) of Lake Chelan-Sawtooth Wilderness are part of the forest, with the balance lying in the Mount Baker-Snoqualmie National Forest.

The western part of the forest is wetter than the dry and less temperate east. The vegetation varies similarly, from the western boreal forest, to the eastern high-elevation steppe. Wildfires are not uncommon in the Okanogan National Forest. Notable fires include the 2006 Tripod Complex, the 2014 Carlton Complex and the 2015 Okanogan Complex fires.

The Okanogan National Forest was established on July 1, 1911, from a portion of the Chelan National Forest.  On July 1, 1921, the entire forest was transferred back to the Chelan National Forest, but on March 23, 1955, the transfer was reverted.

Administration
The Okanogan National Forest was administratively combined with the Wenatchee National Forest in 2000, although the boundaries for each forest remained unchanged, and in 2007, it administratively became known as the Okanogan–Wenatchee National Forest. The headquarters are in Wenatchee, Washington. There are local ranger district offices located in Chelan, Cle Elum, Entiat, Leavenworth, and Naches.

History 
The Forest Reserve Act of 1891 gave the President the authority to establish forest reserves for the United States Department of the Interior. After passage of the Transfer Act of 1905, forest reserves became part of the United States Department of Agriculture in the newly created United States Forest Service. The forest's initial area of  extended from the northern Okanogan River near the Canada–United States border to divide the Lake Chelan and Entiat watersheds to the southern Cascade Crest. On July 1, 1911, the forest partly transformed into Okanogan National Forest. However, Chelan National Forest was still existent, then only occupying the drainage basin of Lake Chelan and Entiat.

The Conconully, Loomis, Squaw Creek, Sweat Creek, Twisp and Winthrop ranger districts were formed between 1911 and 1915. On July 1, 1921, the entire forest reunited back into the Chelan National Forest, and the term Okanogan was discontinued. Subsequently, another ranger district was established, the Chelan Ranger District. Portions of the Loomis Ranger District, along with the Sweat Creek Ranger District, absorbed to become the Loomis State Forest, later abandoned. The forest's ranger area underwent a number of smaller changes until the mid-1940s. The Squaw Creek Ranger District was absorbed by the Twisp Ranger District in the early 1930s, while the Forest Service Monument 83 lookout was constructed in neighboring British Columbia as an accident. The Pasayten Ranger District was later created from a portion of the Winthrop Ranger District, and the Conconully Ranger District became the Okanogan Ranger District. The western part of the Colville National Forest transferred into the Chelan National Forest in 1943. On March 23, 1955, Chelan National Forest again became the Okanogan National Forest, then headquartered in the city of Okanogan. As per the change, the rename of the Conconully Ranger District was reverted.

The United States Congress designated almost 65 percent of the forest's area as the Lake Chelan-Sawtooth Wilderness under the National Wilderness Preservation System around 1984, upon land formerly occupied by the former Chelan Division of the Washington Forest Reserve.

The first forest supervisor of Wenatchee National Forest was Albert H. Sylvester, who named over a thousand natural features in the region.

See also
Jack Creek Fire
Left Hand Fire

References

External links
 Okanogan-Wenatchee National Forest

 
National Forests of Washington (state)
North Cascades of Washington (state)
Protected areas of Okanogan County, Washington
Protected areas established in 1911
Protected areas established in 1955
1911 establishments in Washington (state)
1955 establishments in Washington (state)